Diodorus Buberwa Kamala (26 November 1968) is a Tanzanian politician and diplomat.

Background
Kamala received his doctorate in economics from Mzumbe University. His thesis was on intra-regional trade in the East African Community.

References

1968 births
Living people
Tanzanian MPs 2000–2005
Tanzanian MPs 2005–2010
Ambassadors of Tanzania to Belgium
Alumni of the University of Bradford
Mzumbe University alumni
Tanzanian Roman Catholics